Kevin King was the defending champion but lost in the first round to James Duckworth.

Duckworth won the title after defeating Reilly Opelka 7–6(7–4), 6–3 in the final.

Seeds

Draw

Finals

Top half

Bottom half

References
Main Draw
Qualifying Draw

Cary Challenger - Singles
2018 Singles